(from the) is an augmentative and alternative system of manual communication used in Ireland by developmentally disabled and neurodivergent children and adults. Many of the signs are adapted from Irish Sign Language (ISL), used by the Irish Deaf community.

History
 was developed in the early 1980s. It was discussed at the Second European Congress on Sign Language Research in Amsterdam in 1985.

Features

 is not a true sign language, as only a limited number of expressions are possible. There are over 500 signs; speech is always used with signs and only key words in a sentence are signed.

 is intended to encourage eye contact, develop vocabulary, promote attention to movement, and relieve frustration.

See also
Makaton
Augmentative and alternative communication
Disability rights movement

References

External links

Augmentative and alternative communication
Non-deaf sign languages
Sociological and cultural aspects of autism